Đorđe Pažin (born March 31, 2001) is a Serbian professional basketball player for Forlì 2.015 in the Serie A2.

Professional career
Pažin played for the Stella Azzurra youth system in Rome from 2015 to 2017. On November 15, 2017, Pažin signed a multi-year contract with Partizan Belgrade. In March 2018, he was loaned to Mladost Zemun. In August 2018, he participated at the Basketball Without Borders Europe camp in Belgrade, Serbia.

On November 14, 2019, Pažin signed a three-year contract with FMP. In December, he was loaned out to Sloboda Užice for the 2019–20 season. In September 2020, he parted ways with FMP without a single official game played for the club. On September 22, he signed for Sloboda Užice. On August 16, 2021, he signed for Borac Banja Luka. Pažin parted ways with the team on January 24, 2022, after averaging 8.2 points per game.

References

External links 
Profile at eurobasket.com
Profile at realgm.com
Profile at proballers.com

2001 births
Living people
Basketball League of Serbia players
KK Mladost Zemun players
KK Partizan players
KK Sloboda Užice players
OKK Borac players
People from Ćuprija
Serbian expatriate basketball people in Bosnia and Herzegovina
Serbian expatriate basketball people in Italy
Serbian men's basketball players
Shooting guards
Small forwards